The terrestrial splayfoot salamander (Chiropterotriton terrestris), also known as the terrestrial flat-footed salamander is a species of salamander in the family Plethodontidae. It is endemic to the Sierra Madre Oriental of eastern Hidalgo state, Mexico. Its natural habitats are humid pine–oak and cloud forests. It is threatened by habitat loss due to deforestation and the potential spread of amphibian pathogens due to the illegal pet trade.

References

Chiropterotriton
Endemic amphibians of Mexico
Fauna of the Sierra Madre Oriental
Taxonomy articles created by Polbot
Amphibians described in 1941
Taxa named by Edward Harrison Taylor